Faghiri (adjective form of Fakir or Faqir, a Sufi Muslim ascetic) is a Persian surname. Faqiri is the romanization of its Dari equivalent. Notable people with the surname include:
 Amin Faghiri (born 1943), Iranian researcher and writer
 Mohammad Faghiri (born 1985), Iranian wrestler

References 

Persian-language surnames